Kutang, also known as Kutang Ghale and Kuke, is a minor Tibeto-Burman language of Nepal.

Locations
Kutang is spoken in Dyang, Rana, Bihi, Ghap, Chak, Kwak, and Krak villages of Bihi VDC, Gorkha District, Gandaki Province, Nepal (Ethnologue).

Dialects
There are three Kutang dialects, Bihi, Chak, and Rana, which have limited intelligibility. The varieties spoken in Chhak and Kwak villages are reportedly similar to each other, and different from the varieties spoken in all of the other villages.

References 

Tamangic languages
Languages of Nepal
Endangered Sino-Tibetan languages